The 1999 Cleveland Indians are the only team in Major League Baseball since 1950 to score over 1,000 runs during the regular season.  They were shut out only three times in 162 games. Five Indians scored at least 100 runs and four drove in at least 100 runs. Right fielder Manny Ramirez drove in 165 runs, the most by any MLB player since Jimmie Foxx in 1938.

Offseason
 October 28, 1998: Bruce Aven was selected off waivers by the Florida Marlins from the Cleveland Indians.
 November 18, 1998: Brian Giles was traded by the Indians to the Pittsburgh Pirates for Ricardo Rincón.
 December 1, 1998: Roberto Alomar was signed as a free agent by the Indians.
 December 8, 1998: Mark Whiten was signed as a free agent by the Indians.

Regular season
July 3, 1999: Against the Kansas City Royals, Jim Thome hit a 511 ft home run, the longest ever in Cleveland Indians history. It was hit to center field and cleared the outer gates onto Eagle Avenue outside of Jacobs Field.

Season standings

Record vs. opponents

Transactions
 April 14, 1999: Jhonny Peralta was signed as an amateur free agent by the Indians.

Roster

Game log

|-align="center" bgcolor="#ffbbbb"
| 1 || April 6 || @ Angels || 6 – 5 |||| Karsay (0-1) || Percival (1) || 39,936 || 0-1
|-align="center" bgcolor="#bbffbb"
| 2 || April 7 || @ Angels || 9 – 1 || Burba (1-0) || Hill (0-1) || || 21,689 || 1-1
|-align="center" bgcolor="#bbffbb"
| 3 || April 8 || @ Angels || 9 – 1 || Colón (1-0) || Sparks (0-1) || || 25,084 || 2-1
|-align="center" bgcolor="#bbffbb"
| 4 || April 9 || @ Twins || 14 – 5 || Nagy (1-0) || Hawkins (0-1) || || 16,348 || 3-1
|-align="center" bgcolor="#bbffbb"
| 5 || April 10 || @ Twins || 12 – 7 || Karsay (1-1) || Lincoln (0-2) || || 18,829 || 4-1
|-align="center" bgcolor="#bbffbb"
| 6 || April 11 || @ Twins || 9 – 8 || Wright (1-0) || Radke (1-1) || Jackson (1) || 12,430 || 5-1
|-align="center" bgcolor="#bbffbb"
| 7 || April 12 || Royals || 5 – 2 (10) || Shuey (1-0) || Santiago (0-1) || || 42,798 || 6-1
|-align="center" bgcolor="#bbffbb"
| 8 || April 14 || Royals || 11 – 4 || Colón (2-0) || Suppan (0-2) || || 42,926 || 7-1
|-align="center" bgcolor="#bbffbb"
| 9 || April 17 || Twins || 5 – 1 || Nagy (2-0) || Radke (1-2) || || 40,582 || 8-1
|-align="center" bgcolor="#ffbbbb"
| 10 || April 17 || Twins || 13 – 8 (11) || Aguilera (2-0) || Jackson (0-1) || || 42,860 || 8-2
|-align="center" bgcolor="#bbffbb"
| 11 || April 18 || Twins || 3 – 2 || Shuey (2-0) || Wells (1-1) || Jackson (2) || 42,317 || 9-2
|-align="center" bgcolor="#bbffbb"
| 12 || April 20 || Athletics || 5 – 1 || Colón (3-0) || Rogers (0-2) || || 42,954 || 10-2 
|-align="center" bgcolor="#bbffbb"
| 13 || April 21 || Athletics || 5 – 4 || Reed (1-0) || Taylor (0-1) || || 41,933 || 11-2
|-align="center" bgcolor="#ffbbbb"
| 14 || April 22 || Athletics || 4 – 1 || Candiotti (2-2) || Nagy (2-1) || Taylor (3) || 42,937 || 11-3
|-align="center" bgcolor="#bbffbb"
| 15 || April 23 || @ Red Sox || 7 – 6 || Karsay (2-1) || Corsi (0-1) || Jackson (3) || 29,921 || 12-3
|-align="center" bgcolor="#ffbbbb"
| 16 || April 24 || @ Red Sox || 9 – 4 || Harikkala (1-0) || DeLucia (0-1) || || 29,481 || 12-4
|-align="center" bgcolor="#ffbbbb"
| 17 || April 25 || @ Red Sox || 3 – 2 || Martínez (4-1) || Shuey (2-1) || || 30,472 || 12-5
|-align="center" bgcolor="#bbffbb"
| 18 || April 26 || @ Athletics || 5 – 4 (10) || Karsay (3-1) || Taylor (0-2) || Jackson (4) || 7,646 || 13-5
|-align="center" bgcolor="#bbffbb"
| 19 || April 27 || @ Athletics || 8 – 5 || Nagy (3-1) || Candiotti (2-3) || Jackson (5) || 7,161 || 14-5
|-align="center" bgcolor="#bbffbb"
| 20 || April 28 || @ Athletics || 4 – 1 || Wright (2-0) || Haynes (1-4) || Jackson (6) || 9,555 || 15-5
|-align="center" bgcolor="#bbffbb"
| 21 || April 29 || @ Athletics || 8 – 3 || Burba (2-0) || Oquist (2-2) || || 10,115 || 16-5
|-align="center" bgcolor="#ffbbbb"
| 22 || April 30 || @ Rangers || 7 – 5 || Helling (2-3) || Colón (3-1) || Wetteland (8) || 36,556 || 16-6
|-

|-align="center" bgcolor="#bbffbb"
| 23 || May 1 || @ Rangers || 5 – 3 || Gooden (1-0) || Sele (3-2) || Jackson (7) || 45,579 || 17-6
|-align="center" bgcolor="#ffbbbb"
| 24 || May 2 || @ Rangers || 8 – 6 || Clark (2-2) || Nagy (3-2) || Wetteland (9) || 29,921 || 17-7
|-align="center" bgcolor="#bbffbb"
| 25 || May 3 || @ Rangers || 10 – 4 || Wright (3-0) || Morgan (4-2) || || 31,181 || 18-7
|-align="center" bgcolor="#ffbbbb"
| 26 || May 5 || Mariners || 6 – 5 || Fassero (1-3) || Burba (2-1) || Mesa (7) || 42,991 || 18-8
|-align="center" bgcolor="#bbffbb"
| 27 || May 6 || Mariners || 8 – 4 || Colón (4-1) || Weaver (0-1) || || 41,962 || 19-8
|-align="center" bgcolor="#bbffbb"
| 28 || May 7 || Devil Rays || 20 – 11 || Wagner (1-0) || Mecir (0-1) || || 40,601 || 20-8
|-align="center" bgcolor="#ffbbbb"
| 29 || May 8 || Devil Rays || 7 – 6 || Rekar (3-1) || Nagy (3-3) || Hernández (12) || 40,590 || 20-9
|-align="center" bgcolor="#bbffbb"
| 30 || May 9 || Devil Rays || 5 – 4 || Wright (4-0) || Álvarez (1-2) || Jackson (8) || 42,835 || 21-9
|-align="center" bgcolor="#bbffbb"
| 31 || May 10 || Orioles || 6 – 4 || Burba (3-1) || Guzmán (1-4) || Jackson (9) || 40,615 || 22-9
|-align="center" bgcolor="#bbffbb"
| 32 || May 11 || Orioles || 11 – 6 || Colón (5-1) || Ponson (2-3) || || 40,587 || 23-9
|-align="center" bgcolor="#bbffbb"
| 33 || May 12 || Orioles || 6 – 5 || Assenmacher (1-0) || Timlin (1-2) || Shuey (1) || 42,939 || 24-9
|-align="center" bgcolor="#bbffbb"
| 34 || May 14 || @ Tigers || 4 – 2 || Karsay (4-1) || Brocail (1-1) || Shuey (2) || 21,844 || 25-9
|-align="center" bgcolor="#bbffbb"
| 35 || May 15 || @ Tigers || 12 – 7 || Burba (4-1) || Mlicki (1-3) || || 39,769 || 26-9 
|-align="center" bgcolor="#ffbbbb"
| 36 || May 16 || @ Tigers || 9 – 3 || Weaver (4-3) || Wright (4-1) || Kida (1) || 29,731 || 26-10
|-align="center" bgcolor="#bbffbb"
| 37 || May 17 || @ White Sox || 13 – 9 || Colón (6-1) || Navarro (2-4) || || 17,101 || 27-10
|-align="center" bgcolor="#bbffbb"
| 38 || May 18 || @ White Sox || 13 – 0 || Gooden (2-0) || Baldwin (2-4) || || 13,429 || 28-10
|-align="center" bgcolor="#bbffbb"
| 39 || May 19 || @ White Sox || 13 – 7 || Nagy (4-3) || Parque (5-3) || || 14,854 || 29-10
|-align="center" bgcolor="#ffbbbb"
| 40 || May 21 || Tigers || 9 – 6 || Nitkowski (1-1) || Shuey (2-2) || Jones (7) || 43,290 || 29-11
|-align="center" bgcolor="#ffbbbb"
| 41 || May 22 || Tigers || 6 – 2 || Weaver (5-3) || Wright (4-2) || || 40,991 || 29-12
|-align="center" bgcolor="#bbffbb"
| 42 || May 23 || Tigers || 7 – 4 || Shuey (3-2) || Jones (0-1) || || 40,874 || 30-12
|-align="center" bgcolor="#ffbbbb"
| 43 || May 24 || White Sox || 10 – 3 || Lowe (2-0) || Gooden (2-1) || || 43,208 || 30-13
|-align="center" bgcolor="#bbffbb"
| 44 || May 25 || White Sox || 3 – 1 || Nagy (5-3) || Parque (5-4) || Jackson (10) || 42,161 || 31-13
|-align="center" bgcolor="#bbffbb"
| 45 || May 26 || White Sox || 6 – 2 || Burba (5-1) || Sirotka (2-6) || Shuey (3) || 43,228 || 32-13
|-align="center" bgcolor="#ffbbbb"
| 46 || May 28 || Red Sox || 12 – 5 || Wakefield (3-4) || Wright (4-3) || Lowe (3) || 43,287 || 32-14
|-align="center" bgcolor="#ffbbbb"
| 47 || May 29 || Red Sox || 4 – 2 || Martínez (10-1) || Colón (6-2) || Gordon (9) || 43,255 || 32-15
|-align="center" bgcolor="#ffbbbb"
| 48 || May 30 || Red Sox || 4 – 2 || Rose (3-0) || Gooden (2-2) || Gordon (10) || 43,207 || 32-16
|-align="center" bgcolor="#bbffbb"
| 49 || May 31 || @ Yankees || 7 – 1 || Nagy (6-3) || Hernández (5-5) || || 46,605 || 33-16
|-

|-align="center" bgcolor="#ffbbbb"
| 50 || June 1 || @ Yankees || 11 – 5 || Clemens (5-0) || Burba (5-2) || || 32,759 || 33-17
|-align="center" bgcolor="#bbffbb"
| 51 || June 2 || @ Yankees || 10 – 7 || Karsay (5-1) || Pettitte (3-3) || Jackson (11) || 36,955 || 34-17
|-align="center" bgcolor="#ffbbbb"
| 52 || June 4 || Cubs || 5 – 4 || Aguilera (2-1) || Jackson (0-2) || Adams (2) || 43,011 || 34-18
|-align="center" bgcolor="#bbffbb"
| 53 || June 5 || Cubs || 8 – 7 (11) ||John Cena (4-20)|| Sanders (1-4) || || 43,085 || 35-18
|-align="center" bgcolor="#bbffbb"
| 54 || June 6 || Cubs || 4 – 2 || Nagy (7-3) || Trachsel (2-7) || Shuey (4) || 43,010 || 36-18
|-align="center" bgcolor="#ffbbbb"
| 55 || June 8 || Brewers || 2 – 1 (10) || Roque (1-4) || Assenmacher (1-1) || Wickman (11) || 42,300 || 36-19
|-align="center" bgcolor="#bbffbb"
| 56 || June 9 || Brewers || 6 – 5 (10) || Jackson (2-2) || Roque (1-5) || || 43,160 || 37-19
|-align="center" bgcolor="#ffbbbb"
| 57 || June 10 || Brewers || 15 – 9 || Nomo (3-1) || Colón (6-3) || || 43,196 || 37-20
|-align="center" bgcolor="#bbffbb"
| 58 || June 11 || @ Reds || 8 – 6 || Shuey (4-2) || Williamson (5-2) || Jackson (12) || 42,928 || 38-20
|-align="center" bgcolor="#bbffbb"
| 59 || June 12 || @ Reds || 4 – 3 || Nagy (8-3) || Harnisch (5-6) || Jackson (13) || 52,804 || 39-20
|-align="center" bgcolor="#bbffbb"
| 60 || June 13 || @ Reds || 7 – 3 || Burba (6-2) || Avery (3-6) || Karsay (1) || 45,593 || 40-20
|-align="center" bgcolor="#bbffbb"
| 61 || June 15 || Athletics || 8 – 3 || Wright (5-3) || Haynes (4-6) || || 43,231 || 41-20
|-align="center" bgcolor="#bbffbb"
| 62 || June 16 || Athletics || 9 – 8 || Karsay (6-1) || Taylor (0-4) || || 43,163 || 42-20
|-align="center" bgcolor="#bbffbb"
| 63 || June 17 || Athletics || 10 – 6 || Shuey (5-2) || Worrell (1-1) || || 43,262 || 43-20
|-align="center" bgcolor="#ffbbbb"
| 64 || June 18 || Mariners || 9 – 4 || Halama (5-2) || Nagy (8-4) || || 43,126 || 43-21
|-align="center" bgcolor="#bbffbb"
| 65 || June 19 || Mariners || 10 – 6 || Burba (7-2) || Watson (0-1) || Jackson (14) || 43,205 || 44-21
|-align="center" bgcolor="#bbffbb"
| 66 || June 20 || Mariners || 13 – 5 || Wright (6-3) || Rodriguez (2-1) || || 43,070 || 45-21
|-align="center" bgcolor="#bbffbb"
| 67 || June 21 || Mariners || 4 – 3 (12) || Karsay (7-1) || Mesa (0-2) || || 43,093 || 46-21 
|-align="center" bgcolor="#ffbbbb"
| 68 || June 22 || @ Blue Jays || 4 – 3 || Escobar (7-4) || Gooden (2-3) || Koch (7) || 22,197 || 46-22
|-align="center" bgcolor="#bbffbb"
| 69 || June 23 || @ Blue Jays || 9 – 6 || Nagy (9-4) || Quantrill (0-1) || || 23,271 || 47-22
|-align="center" bgcolor="#ffbbbb"
| 70 || June 24 || @ Blue Jays || 3 – 0 || Halladay (6-3) || Burba (7-3) || Koch (8) || 26,117 || 47-23
|-align="center" bgcolor="#ffbbbb"
| 71 || June 25 || @ Royals || 8 – 2 || Suppan (4-4) || Wright (6-4) || || 32,147 || 47-24
|-align="center" bgcolor="#ffbbbb"
| 72 || June 26 || @ Royals || 11 – 7 || Montgomery (1-3) || Rincón (0-1) || || 29,358 || 47-25
|-align="center" bgcolor="#bbffbb"
| 73 || June 27 || @ Royals || 6 – 5 || Reed (2-0) || Byrdak (0-1) || Jackson (15) || 17,094 || 48-25
|-align="center" bgcolor="#bbffbb"
| 74 || June 28 || @ Royals || 6 – 1 || Nagy (10-4) || Witasick (3-6) || || 23,429 || 49-25
|-align="center" bgcolor="#bbffbb"
| 75 || June 29 || Twins || 5 – 4 || Reed (3-0) || Trombley (1-5) || || 43,159 || 50-25
|-align="center" bgcolor="#ffbbbb"
| 76 || June 30 || Twins || 5 – 3 || Milton (3-7) || Wright (6-5) || Trombley (12) || 43,061 || 50-26
|-

|-align="center" bgcolor="#bbffbb"
| 77 || July 1 || Twins || 7 – 5 || Colón (7-3) || Carrasco (0-1) || Jackson (16) || 43,010 || 51-26
|-align="center" bgcolor="#ffbbbb"
| 78 || July 2 || Royals || 9 – 7 (10) || Whisenant (3-3) || Shuey (5-3) || || 43,172 || 51-27
|-align="center" bgcolor="#bbffbb"
| 79 || July 3 || Royals || 9 – 8 || Candiotti (1-0) || Pisciotta (0-2) || Jackson (17) || 43,086 || 52-27
|-align="center" bgcolor="#bbffbb"
| 80 || July 3 || Royals || 9 – 5 || Langston (1-0) || Wengert (0-1) || Jackson (18) || 40,707 || 53-27
|-align="center" bgcolor="#ffbbbb"
| 81 || July 4 || Royals || 10 – 9 || Appier (8-6) || Burba (7-4) || Byrdak (1) || 43,018 || 53-28
|-align="center" bgcolor="#bbffbb"
| 82 || July 6 || @ Twins || 3 – 1 || Wright (7-5) || Milton (3-8) || Jackson (19) || 12,579 || 54-28
|-align="center" bgcolor="#ffbbbb"
| 83 || July 7 || @ Twins || 4 – 3 || Trombley (2-5) || Reed (3-1) || || 12,710 || 54-29
|-align="center" bgcolor="#bbffbb"
| 84 || July 8 || @ Twins || 9 – 2 || Nagy (11-4) || Lincoln (3-9) || || 14,118 || 55-29
|-align="center" bgcolor="#ffbbbb"
| 85 || July 9 || Reds || 3 – 2 || Avery (6-7) || Burba (7-5) || Williamson (11) || 43,208 || 55-30
|-align="center" bgcolor="#bbffbb"
| 86 || July 10 || Reds || 11 – 10 || Jackson (3-2) || Williamson (7-4) || || 43,127 || 56-30
|-align="center" bgcolor="#ffbbbb"
| 87 || July 11 || Reds || 9 – 4 || Graves (6-3) || Shuey (5-4) || || 43,167 || 56-31
|-align="center" bgcolor="#bbffbb"
| 88 || July 15 || @ Pirates || 2 – 0 || Colón (8-3) || Schmidt (8-7) || Jackson (20) || 39,620 || 57-31
|-align="center" bgcolor="#ffbbbb"
| 89 || July 16 || @ Pirates || 11 – 3 || Córdova (5-4) || Burba (7-6) || || 43,519 || 57-32
|-align="center" bgcolor="#ffbbbb"
| 90 || July 17 || @ Pirates || 13 – 10 || Benson (7-7) || Nagy (11-5) || Williams (14) || 43,299 || 57-33
|-align="center" bgcolor="#ffbbbb"
| 91 || July 18 || @ Astros || 2 – 0 || Hampton (12-3) || Wright (7-6) || || 50,299 || 57-34
|-align="center" bgcolor="#ffbbbb"
| 92 || July 19 || @ Astros || 3 – 2 (11) || Cabrera (3-0) || Candiotti (1-1) || || 34,276 || 57-35
|-align="center" bgcolor="#bbffbb"
| 93 || July 20 || @ Astros || 7 – 1 || Colón (9-3) || Reynolds (11-7) || || 41,133 || 58-35
|-align="center" bgcolor="#ffbbbb"
| 94 || July 21 || Blue Jays || 4 – 3 || Frascatore (5-0) || Jackson (3-3) || Koch (16) || 43,218 || 58-36
|-align="center" bgcolor="#ffbbbb"
| 95 || July 22 || Blue Jays || 4 – 3 || Wells (11-6) || Nagy (11-6) || Koch (17) || 43,138 || 58-37
|-align="center" bgcolor="#ffbbbb"
| 96 || July 23 || @ Yankees || 9 – 8 (10) || Grimsley (7-1) || Jackson (3-4) || || 52,704 || 58-38
|-align="center" bgcolor="#ffbbbb"
| 97 || July 24 || @ Yankees || 21 – 1 || Irabu (7-3) || Langston (1-1) || || 54,870 || 58-39
|-align="center" bgcolor="#ffbbbb"
| 98 || July 25 || @ Yankees || 2 – 1 || Mendoza (4-6) || Rincón (0-2) || || 54,944 || 58-40
|-align="center" bgcolor="#bbffbb"
| 99 || July 26 || Tigers || 6 – 3 || Burba (8-6) || Thompson (9-9) || Jackson (21) || 43,157 || 59-40
|-align="center" bgcolor="#bbffbb"
| 100 || July 27 || Tigers || 14 – 5 || Nagy (12-6) || Borkowski (0-1) || || 43,042 || 60-40
|-align="center" bgcolor="#bbffbb"
| 101 || July 28 || Tigers || 7 – 2 || Gooden (3-3) || Moehler (8-10) || || 43,162 || 61-40
|-align="center" bgcolor="#bbffbb"
| 102 || July 30 || White Sox || 10 – 2 || Colón (10-3) || Sirotka (7-10) || || 43,181 || 62-40
|-align="center" bgcolor="#bbffbb"
| 103 || July 31 || White Sox || 13 – 10 || Shuey (6-4) || Castillo (1-1) || Jackson (22) || 43,209 || 63-40
|-

|-align="center" bgcolor="#ffbbbb"
| 104 || August 1 || White Sox || 6 – 3 || Baldwin (5-11) || Nagy (12-7) || Howry (17) || 43,067 || 63-41
|-align="center" bgcolor="#bbffbb"
| 105 || August 2 || @ Red Sox || 7 – 5 || Karsay (8-1) || Garces (0-1) || Jackson (23) || 33,218 || 64-41
|-align="center" bgcolor="#bbffbb"
| 106 || August 3 || @ Red Sox || 5 – 4 || Shuey (7-4) || Wakefield (3-8) || Jackson (24) || 33,650 || 65-41
|-align="center" bgcolor="#ffbbbb"
| 107 || August 4 || @ Red Sox || 7 – 2 || Portugal (7-8) || Colón (10-4) || || 33,282 || 65-42
|-align="center" bgcolor="#ffbbbb"
| 108 || August 6 || @ Devil Rays || 4 – 2 || Yan (3-2) || Burba (8-7) || Hernández (29) || 34,623 || 65-43
|-align="center" bgcolor="#bbffbb"
| 109 || August 7 || @ Devil Rays || 15 – 10 || Nagy (13-7) || Witt (6-8) || || 39,512 || 66-43
|-align="center" bgcolor="#ffbbbb"
| 110 || August 8 || @ Devil Rays || 5 – 3 || Álvarez (6-6) || Wright (7-7) || Hernández (30) || 33,052 || 66-44
|-align="center" bgcolor="#bbffbb"
| 111 || August 9 || @ Angels || 4 – 0 || Colón (11-4) || Hill (4-11) || || 22,013 || 67-44
|-align="center" bgcolor="#bbffbb"
| 112 || August 10 || @ Angels || 2 – 1 (10) || Rincón (1-2) || Petkovsek (9-4) || Jackson (25) || 25,777 || 68-44
|-align="center" bgcolor="#bbffbb"
| 113 || August 11 || @ Angels || 4 – 3 || Burba (9-7) || Sparks (5-9) || Jackson (26) || 26,399 || 69-44
|-align="center" bgcolor="#bbffbb"
| 114 || August 13 || Orioles || 6 – 3 || Rincón (2-2) || Erickson (8-10) || Jackson (27) || 43,073 || 70-44
|-align="center" bgcolor="#bbffbb"
| 115 || August 14 || Orioles || 7 – 1 || Karsay (9-1) || Johnson (3-7) || || 43,103 || 71-44
|-align="center" bgcolor="#bbffbb"
| 116 || August 15 || Orioles || 5 – 1 || Colón (12-4) || Ponson (11-8) || || 43,020 || 72-44
|-align="center" bgcolor="#ffbbbb"
| 117 || August 16 || Rangers || 13 – 5 || Munoz (2-1) || Rincón (2-3) || || 43,226 || 72-45
|-align="center" bgcolor="#ffbbbb"
| 118 || August 17 || Rangers || 15 – 4 || Sele (13-7) || Langston (1-2) || || 42,987 || 72-46
|-align="center" bgcolor="#ffbbbb"
| 119 || August 18 || Rangers || 6 – 1 || Burkett (4-6) || Nagy (13-8) || || 42,997 || 72-47
|-align="center" bgcolor="#bbffbb"
| 120 || August 19 || Rangers || 8 – 0 || Karsay (10-1) || Morgan (12-8) || || 43,263 || 73-47
|-align="center" bgcolor="#bbffbb"
| 121 || August 20 || @ Mariners || 7 – 4 || Colón (13-4) || Halama (9-5) || Jackson (28) || 44,915 || 74-47
|-align="center" bgcolor="#bbffbb"
| 122 || August 21 || @ Mariners || 6 – 0 || Burba (10-7) || Meche (4-3) || || 44,891 || 75-47
|-align="center" bgcolor="#bbffbb"
| 123 || August 22 || @ Mariners || 7 – 4 (10) || Riske (1-0) || Mesa (1-5) || Jackson (29) || 44,941 || 76-47
|-align="center" bgcolor="#ffbbbb"
| 124 || August 23 || @ Mariners || 4 – 1 || Abbott (5-0) || Nagy (13-9) || Mesa (28) || 44,689 || 76-48 
|-align="center" bgcolor="#ffbbbb"
| 125 || August 24 || @ Athletics || 11 – 10 || Mathews (8-3) || Shuey (7-5) || || 17,417 || 76-49
|-align="center" bgcolor="#bbffbb"
| 126 || August 25 || @ Athletics || 12 – 4 || Colón (14-4) || Oquist (9-9) || || 21,328 || 77-49
|-align="center" bgcolor="#bbffbb"
| 127 || August 27 || Devil Rays || 2 – 1 || Burba (11-7) || Arrojo (4-9) || Jackson (30) || 43,303 || 78-49
|-align="center" bgcolor="#bbffbb"
| 128 || August 28 || Devil Rays || 3 – 0 || Nagy (14-9) || Witt (7-11) || Jackson (31) || 43,190 || 79-49
|-align="center" bgcolor="#ffbbbb"
| 129 || August 29 || Devil Rays || 6 – 4 || Álvarez (9-6) || Haney (0-1) || Hernández (36) || 43,151 || 79-50
|-align="center" bgcolor="#bbffbb"
| 130 || August 30 || Angels || 7 – 5 || Colón (15-4) || Levine (1-1) || Jackson (32) || 43,295 || 80-50
|-align="center" bgcolor="#bbffbb"
| 131 || August 31 || Angels || 14 – 12 || Poole (1-0) || Percival (3-4) || Shuey (5) || 43,284 || 81-50
|-

|-align="center" bgcolor="#bbffbb"
| 132 || September 1 || Angels || 8 – 1 || Burba (12-7) || Washburn (0-3) || || 43,399 || 82-50
|-align="center" bgcolor="#bbffbb"
| 133 || September 2 || Angels || 6 – 5 || Nagy (15-9) || Sparks (5-11) || Jackson (33) || 43,369 || 83-50
|-align="center" bgcolor="#bbffbb"
| 134 || September 3 || @ Orioles || 7 – 6 || Assenmacher (2-1) || Reyes (0-3) || Jackson (34) || 41,521 || 84-50
|-align="center" bgcolor="#ffbbbb"
| 135 || September 4 || @ Orioles || 3 – 1 || Linton (1-2) || Colón (15-5) || Timlin (19) || 47,095 || 84-51
|-align="center" bgcolor="#bbffbb"
| 136 || September 5 || @ Orioles || 15 – 7 || Brower (1-0) || Ponson (11-11) || || 44,214 || 85-51
|-align="center" bgcolor="#bbffbb"
| 137 || September 6 || @ Orioles || 7 – 6 || Burba (13-7) || Johns (4-3) || Jackson (35) || 40,540 || 86-51
|-align="center" bgcolor="#ffbbbb"
| 138 || September 7 || @ Rangers || 4 – 3 || Sele (16-7) || Reed (3-2) || Wetteland (40) || 26,011 || 86-52
|-align="center" bgcolor="#ffbbbb"
| 139 || September 8 || @ Rangers || 3 – 0 || Burkett (7-7) || Haney (0-2) || Wetteland (41) || 29,889 || 86-53
|-align="center" bgcolor="#bbffbb"
| 140 || September 10 || @ White Sox || 14 – 6 || Colón (16-5) || Wells (2-1) || || 19,132 || 87-53
|-align="center" bgcolor="#bbffbb"
| 141 || September 11 || @ White Sox || 4 – 3 || Burba (14-7) || Parque (9-13) || Jackson (36) || 34,400 || 88-53
|-align="center" bgcolor="#ffbbbb"
| 142 || September 12 || @ White Sox || 4 – 3 || Sirotka (9-13) || Wright (7-8) || Howry (22) || 20,481 || 88-54
|-align="center" bgcolor="#bbffbb"
| 143 || September 13 || Red Sox || 11 – 7 || Nagy (16-9) || Wakefield (5-10) || Shuey (6) || 43,264 || 89-54
|-align="center" bgcolor="#ffbbbb"
| 144 || September 14 || Red Sox || 12 – 3 || Lowe (6-3) || Gooden (3-4) || || 43,203 || 89-55
|-align="center" bgcolor="#ffbbbb"
| 145 || September 15 || Red Sox || 6 – 4 (13) || Wasdin (8-3) || Brower (1-1) || || 43,224 || 89-56
|-align="center" bgcolor="#ffbbbb"
| 146 || September 16 || Yankees || 9 – 5 || Irabu (11-6) || Burba (14-8) || || 43,054 || 89-57
|-align="center" bgcolor="#ffbbbb"
| 147 || September 17 || Yankees || 9 – 4 || Clemens (13-9) || Wright (7-9) || || 43,029 || 89-58
|-align="center" bgcolor="#bbffbb"
| 148 || September 18 || Yankees || 5 – 4 || Nagy (17-9) || Hernández (16-9) || Jackson (37) || 43,002 || 90-58
|-align="center" bgcolor="#ffbbbb"
| 149 || September 19 || Yankees || 11 – 7 || Watson (4-1) || Martin (0-1) || || 42,969 || 90-59
|-align="center" bgcolor="#ffbbbb"
| 150 || September 20 || @ Tigers || 4 – 3 (10) || Jones (4-4) || Riske (1-1) || || 26,106 || 90-60
|-align="center" bgcolor="#bbffbb"
| 151 || September 21 || @ Tigers || 6 – 1 || Burba (15-8) || Borkowski (1-5) || || 24,155 || 91-60
|-align="center" bgcolor="#bbffbb"
| 152 || September 22 || @ Tigers || 9 – 1 || Wright (8-9) || Moehler (9-16) || || 27,355 || 92-60
|-align="center" bgcolor="#ffbbbb"
| 153 || September 23 || @ Tigers || 7 – 5 || Blair (3-11) || Nagy (17-10) || Jones (26) || 34,970 || 92-61
|-align="center" bgcolor="#bbffbb"
| 154 || September 24 || @ Blue Jays || 18 – 4 || Brower (2-1) || Munro (0-2) || || 26,620 || 93-61
|-align="center" bgcolor="#bbffbb"
| 155 || September 25 || @ Blue Jays || 9 – 6 || Colón (17-5) || Spoljaric (2-1) || Jackson (38) || 32,029 || 94-61
|-align="center" bgcolor="#bbffbb"
| 156 || September 26 || @ Blue Jays || 11 – 7 || Shuey (8-5) || Koch (0-5) || || 34,253 || 95-61
|-align="center" bgcolor="#bbffbb"
| 157 || September 28 || @ Royals || 2 – 1 || Brower (3-1) || Witasick (9-12) || Jackson (39) || 11,009 || 96-61
|-align="center" bgcolor="#ffbbbb"
| 158 || September 29 || @ Royals || 5 – 2 || Rosado (10-14) || Nagy (17-11) || || 11,814 || 96-62
|-align="center" bgcolor="#bbffbb"
| 159 || September 30 || Blue Jays || 9 – 2 || Colón (18-5) || Spoljaric (2-2) || || 43,201 || 97-62
|-

|-align="center" bgcolor="#ffbbbb"
| 160 || October 1 || Blue Jays || 8 – 6 || Quantrill (3-2) || Karsay (10-2) || Koch (30) || 43,040 || 97-63
|-align="center" bgcolor="#ffbbbb"
| 161 || October 2 || Blue Jays || 7 – 3 || Hentgen (11-12) || Wright (8-10) || Koch (31) || 43,049 || 97-64
|-align="center" bgcolor="#ffbbbb"
| 162 || October 3 || Blue Jays || 9 – 2 || Wells (17-10) || Burba (15-9) || || 43,012 || 97-65
|-

|-align="center" bgcolor="#bbffbb"
| 1 || October 6 || Red Sox || 3 – 2 || Shuey (1-0) || Lowe (0-1) || || 45,182 || 1-0
|-align="center" bgcolor="#bbffbb"
| 2 || October 7 || Red Sox || 11 – 1 || Nagy (1-0) || Saberhagen (0-1) || || 45,184 || 2-0
|-align="center" bgcolor="#ffbbbb"
| 3 || October 9 || @ Red Sox || 9 – 3 || Lowe (1-0) || Wright (0-1) || || 33,539 || 2-1
|-align="center" bgcolor="#ffbbbb"
| 4 || October 10 || @ Red Sox || 23 – 7 || Garces (1-0) || Colón (0-1) || || 33,898 || 2-2
|-align="center" bgcolor="#ffbbbb"
| 5 || October 12 || Red Sox || 12 – 8 || Martínez (1-0) || Shuey (1-1) || || 45,114 || 2-3
|-

Player stats

Batting

Starters by position
Note: Pos = Position; G = Games played; AB = At bats; R = Runs scored; H = Hits; 2B = Doubles; 3B = Triples; HR = Home runs; RBI = Runs batted in; AVG = Batting average; SB = Stolen bases

Other batters
Note: G = Games played; AB = At bats; R = Runs scored; H = Hits; 2B = Doubles; 3B = Triples; HR = Home runs; RBI = Runs batted in; AVG = Batting average; SB = Stolen bases

Note: Pitchers' batting statistics are not included above.

Pitching

Starting pitchers
Note: W = Wins; L = Losses; ERA = Earned run average; G = Games pitched; GS = Games started; IP = Innings pitched; H = Hits allowed; BB = Walks allowed; K = Strikeouts

Other pitchers
Note: W = Wins; L = Losses; ERA = Earned run average; G = Games pitched; GS = Games started; SV = Saves; IP = Innings pitched; H = Hits allowed; BB = Walks allowed; K = Strikeouts

Relief pitchers
Note: W = Wins; L = Losses; ERA = Earned run average; G = Games pitched; SV = Saves; IP = Innings pitched; H = Hits allowed; BB = Walks allowed; K = Strikeouts

Award winners

All-Star Game

Minor league affiliates

Notes

References 
1999 Cleveland Indians at Baseball Reference
1999 Cleveland Indians at Baseball Almanac

Cleveland Guardians seasons
Cleveland Indians season
American League Central champion seasons
Cleveland Indians